Herbert Alfred Davis (30 March 1897 – 1973) was an English footballer who played in the Football League for Nottingham Forest and Reading.

References

1890s births
1973 deaths
English footballers
Association football forwards
English Football League players
Nottingham Forest F.C. players
Boston Town F.C. (1920s) players
Reading F.C. players
Mansfield Town F.C. players